A violin is a bowed string instrument with four strings tuned in perfect fifths.

Violin may also refer to:

Entertainment
 Violin (2011 film), a Malayalam film
 Violin (2017 film), a Russian film
 Violin (novel), novel by Anne Rice
 The Violin, a 2005 Mexican film

Music
 Violin (album), album by violinist Vanessa-Mae
 "Violin", a children's song by They Might Be Giants on their album No!

Instruments
 Violin family, family of string based instruments developed in sixteenth century Italy
 Violin octet, family of string based instruments developed in twentieth century United States of America
 Bass violin, various bass instruments of the violin family
 Baritone violin, violin variant either one octave below convention or the third largest member of the violin octet family
 Baroque violin, violin whose design is based in the baroque period
 Electric violin, electrical variant of the standard violin
 Five string violin, five string variant of the violin
 Kit violin, small violin designed to fit in a pocket
 Nail violin, instrument categorised as a friction idiophone
 Stroh violin, violin that uses metal resonators or metal horns to amplify sounds
 Tenor violin, instrument with a range between a cello and a viola

Other uses
 Violin beetle, species of ground beetles
 Violin Island or Pulau Biola, island off the coast of Singapore
 Violin Memory, US manufacturer of flash memory arrays
 Violin plot, in mathematics a box plot that illustrates probability density function
 VIOLIN vaccine database

See also
 Fiddle, colloquial term for the instrument
 List of compositions for violin and orchestra
 List of violinists